Lenningen is a commune and small town in southeastern Luxembourg.  The commune has a population of about 1,900. It is located about 20 km east of the capital city, Luxembourg City.  The commune's administrative centre is Canach.

, the town of Lenningen, which lies in the east of the commune, has a population of 385. The only other town within the commune is Canach.

Population

References

External links
 

Communes in Remich (canton)
Towns in Luxembourg